The Mosaic of Virgil is a mosaic found on the site of the ancient Hadrumetum and currently preserved in Bardo National Museum in Tunis, where it constitutes one of its key pieces. It is currently the oldest portrait of the Latin poet Virgil.

History
The mosaic was discovered in 1896 in a garden of Sousse and constitutes the emblem of a larger mosaic.

Description
It is included in a frame of 1.22-meter side.

Central character

It represents the Roman poet Virgil, dressed in a white toga decorated with embroidery.

The poet holds in his hand, which is placed on his knees, a roll of parchment on which are written extracts of the Aeneid, more precisely the eighth verse: "Musa, mihi causas memora, quo numine laeso, quidve..."

Muses
He is surrounded by the muses Clio and Melpomene: Clio, the muse of history, is placed on the left of the poet and shown reading, while Melpomene, the muse of tragedy, is holding a tragic mask.

Interpretation
The work is the oldest known representation of the poet to date. Some have seen it, according to Mohamed Yacoub, a representation of the owner of the house, passionate about the poet. The dating of the pavement ranged from 1st to 4th century but can not exceed the 3rd century, due to the archaeological context of its discovery according to the same author.

See also

 List of ancient Romans
 Outline of ancient Rome
 Roman mosaic

References

Bibliography
 Aïcha Ben Abed-Ben Khader, Le musée du Bardo, éd. Cérès, Tunis, 1992
 Mohamed Yacoub, Le Musée du Bardo : départements antiques, éd. Agence nationale du patrimoine, Tunis, 1993
 Mohamed Yacoub, Splendeurs des mosaïques de Tunisie, éd. Agence nationale du patrimoine, Tunis, 1995

External links
 Paul Gauckler, « Mosaïques découvertes à Sousse », CRAI, vol. 40, n°6, 1896, pp. 578–582
 Jean Martin, « Le portrait de Virgile et les sept premiers vers de l'Enéide (pl. XIII-XIX) », Mélanges d'archéologie et d'histoire, vol. 32, n°32, 1912, pp. 385–395
 Gérard Minaud, « Des doigts pour le dire. Le comput digital et ses symboles dans l'iconographie romaine », Histoire de la mesure, vol. XXI, n°1, 2006
 M. Nowicka et Z. Kiss, « Autour du portrait de Virgile à Sousse », Studia i Prace, vol. 15, 1990, pp. 303–307

Roman mosaics
Ancient Tunisia
Collections of the Bardo National Museum (Tunis)
Cultural depictions of Virgil